FabricLive.29 is a DJ mix compilation album by Cut Copy released as part of the FabricLive Mix Series.

Track listing
  Joakim - I Wish You Were Gone - Versatile
  Cut Copy - Future Unlimited - Modular
  Munk - Disco Clown - Gomma
  2 tracks mixed:
  WhoMadeWho - Hello Empty Room - Gomma
  Cut Copy - Future Unlimited - Modular
  New Young Pony Club - Get Dancey - alt< Recordings
  In Flagranti - Bang Bang - Codek
  Goldfrapp - Slide in (DFA Remix) - Mute
  Severed Heads - Dead Eyes Opened (Extended Mix) - SevCom
  WhoMadeWho - Out The Door (Super Discount Remix) - Gomma
  Daft Punk - Face To Face - Virgin
  The Presets - Truth and Lies - Modular
  MSTRKRFT - Work On You - Last Gang
  Casco Presents BWH - Stop - Radius
  The Faint - Your Retro Career Melted (Ursula 1000 Urgent / Nervous Remix) - Saddle Creek
  Soulwax - E Talking" (Tiga's Disco Drama Remix) - PIAS
  Ciccone Youth - Into The Groovey - Ciccone Youth
  Justice - Waters of Nazareth (Erol's Dur Dur Durrr Re-Edit) - Ed Banger
  Grauzone - Eisbär - Welt
  Riot In Belgium - The Acid Never Lies - Relish
  Midnight Juggernauts - Shadows - Cutters
  Fred Falke - Omega Man - Work It Baby
  Daniel Diamond - Champu - City Rockers
  Roxy Music - Angel Eyes - EMI
  Cut Copy - Going Nowhere (Whitey Remix) - Modular
  Cut Copy - Dream Sequence - Modular

External links
Fabric: FabricLive.29

2006 compilation albums
Cut Copy albums
Live